Sa Re Ga Ma Pa L'il Champs 2017 (stylised as Saregamapa Li'l Champs) is an Indian singing competition television series which premiered on 25 February 2017 on Zee TV. In a back-to-school format that lends itself to a spirited atmosphere of camaraderie and fun, the L’il Champs represent their schools.

For the first time in L'il Champs, they have incorporated the format created for Sa Re Ga Ma Pa 2016. There is a 30-member Grand Jury which grades the contestants and the average percentage of their scores is displayed. Himesh Reshammiya, Neha Kakkar and Javed Ali are the mentors in the show, whereas Aditya Narayan is the host.  The show went off air on 29 October 2017 following the Great Grand Finale in Jaipur.  Shreyan Bhattacharya and Anjali Gaikwad were announced as the winners.

Format 
Children aged 5–14 years participate in a singing competition. In the auditions round, they have 100 seconds to impress the three judges and the 30 members of the grand jury. If two of the three judges say yes and they secure at least 50 percent of the support of the grand jury, then the contestant progresses to the next round.

In the Gala round, the judges select the student of the week who they consider the best performer. The contestant gets to sit on a 'flying sofa', which indicates that the contestant is safe from next week's elimination.

The audience vote will come in later in the competition. The contestant with the highest votes in the final round will win the competition.

Grand jury
The show has a panel of 30 jury members who are experts from the music industry. They closely assess the contestants from the audition stage wherein they help the mentors in the selection process and are present in the show during the studio rounds too.

Some of them are:

Top 14 Contestants

 Jayas Kumar, a 5-year-old boy from Delhi is a special non-competitive participant of the show retained only for cute singing. He won the Little Genius Award from Zee TV.

Extra challengers

References

2010s Indian television series
Hindi-language television shows
Television shows set in Mumbai
Sa Re Ga Ma Pa
Zee TV original programming